Thomas "Tom" Spence Tetley (birth registered second  1856 – 15 August 1924) was an English rugby union footballer who played in the 1870s. He played at representative level for England, and at club level for Bradford F.C., as a three-quarter, i.e. wing or centre. Prior to Tuesday 27 August 1895, Bradford F.C. was a rugby union club, it then became a rugby league club, and since 1907 it has been the association football (soccer) club Bradford Park Avenue.

Background
Tom Tetley's birth was registered in Bradford, West Riding of Yorkshire, and he died aged 68 in Wharfedale, West Riding of Yorkshire.

Playing career

International honours
Tetley won a cap for England while at Bradford F.C. in 1875–76 Home Nations rugby union match against Scotland.

Change of Code
When Bradford F.C. converted from the rugby union code to the rugby league code on Tuesday 27 August 1895, Tom Tetley would have been approximately 39. Consequently, he would have probably been too old to have been both a rugby union and rugby league footballer for Bradford F.C.

Genealogical information
Tom Tetley's marriage was registered during second  1881 in Knaresborough.

References

External links
Search for "Tetley" at rugbyleagueproject.org (RL)
Photograph "First International" at rlhp.co.uk

1856 births
1924 deaths
Bradford F.C. players
England international rugby union players
English rugby union players
Rugby union players from Bradford
Rugby union three-quarters